Eloy José Olaya Prendes (born 10 July 1964, in Gijón, Asturias), known simply as Eloy, is a Spanish retired footballer who played as a forward.

Club career
During his career, Eloy played for Sporting de Gijón (being part of a strong 80's team that achieved two fourth places in La Liga, in 1985 and 1987, with the player scoring 11 goals in 43 games in the latter season), Valencia CF (with roughly the same individual records, helping the Che to a runner-up spot in the 1989–90 campaign) and CD Badajoz (retiring after an unassuming Segunda División spell). On 28 November 1979, aged only 15, he made his professional debut, appearing with the Asturias side in a Copa del Rey contest against CD Turón as the Royal Spanish Football Federation did not allow clubs to field players from the reserves, which were able to also compete in the tournament in that period.

After retiring in 1998 at the age of 34, with top level totals of 429 matches and 76 goals, Eloy served as director of football for main club Sporting, from 2001 to 2006.

International career
During slightly less than five years, Eloy earned 15 caps and scored four goals for the Spain national team. He was a participant in the 1986 FIFA World Cup where he netted against Algeria in a 3–0 win, also missing in a penalty shootout quarter-final loss to Belgium, and UEFA Euro 1988 (no appearances).

Eloy's debut came on 20 November 1985 in a 0–0 friendly with Austria, played in Zaragoza.

International goals

Honours

Club
Valencia
Copa del Rey: Runner-up 1994–95

International
Spain U21
UEFA European Under-21 Championship: 1986

See also
 List of La Liga players (400+ appearances)
 List of Sporting de Gijón players (+100 appearances)
 List of Valencia CF players (+100 appearances)

References

External links

CiberChe biography and stats 

1964 births
Living people
Footballers from Gijón
Spanish footballers
Association football forwards
La Liga players
Segunda División players
Segunda División B players
Colegio de la Inmaculada (Gijón) footballers
Sporting de Gijón B players
Sporting de Gijón players
Valencia CF players
CD Badajoz players
Spain youth international footballers
Spain under-21 international footballers
Spain international footballers
1986 FIFA World Cup players
UEFA Euro 1988 players
Colegio de la Inmaculada (Gijón) alumni